Gymnosagena nyikaensis is a species of tephritid or fruit flies in the genus Gymnosagena of the family Tephritidae.

Distribution
Malawi.

References

Tephritinae
Insects described in 2006
Diptera of Africa